Mountelgonia abercornensis is a moth of the family Cossidae. It is found in north-eastern Zambia. The habitat consists of woodland mosaic at high elevations.

The wingspan is about 25 mm. The forewings are warm buff, the costal margin is buckthorn brown. The hindwings are glossy warm buff.

Etymology
The species is named after the type locality of Abercorn (now Mbala, Zambia).

References

Endemic fauna of Zambia
Moths described in 2013
Mountelgonia
Fauna of Zambia
Moths of Africa